Peter Arens (1928–2015) was a German-born Swiss film and television actor.

Selected filmography
 The Mountains Between Us (1956)
 The Last Summer (1954)
 Silence in the Forest (1955)
 Uli the Tenant (1955)
 Regine (1956)
 Through the Forests and Through the Trees (1956)
 Queen Louise (1957)
 Morning's at Seven (1968)
 Assassination in Davos (1975)
  (1978, TV film)
 Villa Amalia (2009)

References

Bibliography
 Goble, Alan. The Complete Index to Literary Sources in Film. Walter de Gruyter, 1999.

External links

1928 births
2015 deaths
German male film actors
German male television actors
Actors from Freiburg im Breisgau
German emigrants to Switzerland
Swiss male film actors
Swiss male television actors